The MV Beluga Nomination incident was the capture and attempted liberation of a German freighter from Somali pirates by the Seychelles Coast Guard and Royal Danish Navy in January 2011. A few days after the taking of MV Beluga Nomination, a Seychelles patrol boat and a Danish flexible support ship, encountered the pirates and engaged in a failed rescue operation.

Incident
MV Beluga Nomination is a multipurpose heavy lift project carrier of Beluga Shipping and was on a commercial voyage from Malta to the South Korean port of Masan, stopping at the Point Victoria in the Seychelles during the passage through the Indian Ocean. Her crew consisted of twelve men with a Polish captain, two Ukrainian, two Russian and seven Filipino sailors. Automatic weapons fire erupted when the Somalis boarded the freighter, at which time the crew of twelve men sent out a distress call and entered the ship's citadel. The pirates were well armed and well prepared. A blowtorch was brought along and for several hours the Somalis welded their way into the citadel while sailing for the African mainland. The distress call was picked up by allied naval forces operating in the area on 22 January and the closest warship to the scene of Beluga Nominations seizure was a Seychellois patrol boat, and the Danish command and support ship .

A skirmish ensued as boarding parties attempted to retake the freighter while under cover from small naval guns and machine guns. The pirates used small arms and rocket-propelled grenades, and ultimately the Seychellois were repelled in their attempts at boarding though they killed one or two pirates. In the confusion, two of Beluga Nominations crew, a Ukrainian and a Filipino, lowered a lifeboat and escaped by heading towards HDMS Esbern Snare. The two were picked up in healthy condition and they reported that the Somalis killed two of their shipmates and two others were missing and presumed dead after they jumped overboard. The German government issued a statement saying that the two hostages were either killed by the pirates or drowned at sea. When the Danish and the Seychellois realized they had failed the operation, they broke off the engagement and let the pirates go. No casualties were reported other than that of the pirates and the civilians. Beluga Nomination rendezvoused with  York on the following day. Because of mechanical problems caused by battle damage, both ships then sailed for Somalia. In April the ship was finally released after her owners paid a large ransom.

See also
 List of ships attacked by Somali pirates in 2011
 Piracy in the Caribbean
 West Indies anti-piracy operations of the United States

References

Conflicts in 2011
Naval battles involving pirates
Naval battles involving Denmark
Naval battles involving Seychelles
Piracy in Somalia
2011 in Somalia
Combat incidents
Naval battles of Operation Enduring Freedom
January 2011 events in Africa